Alan Hopper (born 17 July 1937) is an English former professional footballer who played as a right back.

Career
Born in Newcastle, Hopper played for Newcastle United, South Shields, Barnsley and Bradford City.

References

1937 births
Living people
English footballers
Darlington Town F.C. players
Newcastle United F.C. players
South Shields F.C. (1936) players
Barnsley F.C. players
Bradford City A.F.C. players
English Football League players
Association football fullbacks